Philip Damien Cummins  (9 November 1939 – 24 February 2019) was an Australian lawyer and judge of the Supreme Court of Victoria. Cummins was the presiding judge in the trials of the Silk–Miller police murders, the death of Daniel Valerio and the trial of Robert Farquharson.  He chaired the Protecting Victoria’s Vulnerable Children Inquiry in 2011 before being appointed chairperson of the Victorian Law Reform Commission. He was made a Member of the Order of Australia in the 2014 Queen's Birthday Honours.

Cummins died in office on 24 February 2019 following a short illness.

References

1939 births
2019 deaths
Judges of the Supreme Court of Victoria
University of Melbourne alumni
Melbourne Law School alumni
Academic staff of the University of Melbourne
People educated at Xavier College
Australian King's Counsel
Members of the Order of Australia